Texas's 10th congressional district of the United States House of Representatives stretches from the northwestern portion of the Greater Houston region to the Greater Austin region. It includes Houston suburbs such as Katy, Cypress, Tomball, and Prairie View, cities in east-central Texas including Brenham and Columbus, and northern Austin and some suburbs including Pflugerville, Bastrop, Manor, and Elgin. The current representative is Michael McCaul.

For most of the time from 1903 to 2005, the 10th was centered on Austin. It originally included large portions of the Texas Hill Country. Future President Lyndon B. Johnson represented this district from 1937 to 1949. During the second half of the 20th century, Austin's dramatic growth resulted in the district becoming more compact over the years. By the 1990s, it was reduced to little more than Austin itself and surrounding suburbs in Travis County.

However, in a mid-decade redistricting conducted in 2003, the 10th was dramatically altered. It lost much of the southern portion of its territory. To make up for the loss in population, it was extended all the way to the outer fringes of Houston, making the new district heavily Republican. Five-term Democratic incumbent Lloyd Doggett was forced to transfer to another district. McCaul won the open seat in 2004, and has held it ever since.

List of members representing the district

Recent election results

2004 
Due to the 2003 mid-decade redistricting plan, the 10th's boundaries were gerrymandered forcing Democratic incumbent Lloyd Doggett to redistrict to the 25th district. Attorney Michael McCaul won the Republican nomination and ran without any major-party opposition.

2006

2008

2010

2012

2014

2016

2018 

Incumbent Michael McCaul faced Assistant Attorney of Austin Mike Siegel in the 2018 general election, winning by 4.3 percent of the vote. This is the closest contest McCaul has faced. The outcome was notable in a district that political experts rated as “Heavily Republican.”

2020 

In the November 3, 2020 general election, incumbent Michael McCaul again defeated Austin Assistant Attorney Mike Siegel.

2022

See also

List of United States congressional districts

References

 Congressional Biographical Directory of the United States 1774–present

10
Austin County, Texas
Bastrop County, Texas
Burleson County, Texas
Harris County, Texas
Lee County, Texas
Travis County, Texas
Waller County, Texas
Washington County, Texas
Lyndon B. Johnson